California's 22nd State Senate district is one of 40 California State Senate districts. It is currently represented by Democrat Susan Rubio of Baldwin Park.

District profile 
The district encompasses much of the San Gabriel Valley and parts of the foothills. It is ethnically and socioeconomically diverse, with significant Latino and Asian populations.

Los Angeles County – 9.5%
 Alhambra
 Arcadia
 Azusa
 Baldwin Park
 Covina
 Duarte
 El Monte
 Industry – 93.6%
 Irwindale
 La Puente
 Monterey Park
 Rosemead
 San Gabriel
 South El Monte
 Temple City
 West Covina – 71.3%

Election results from statewide races

List of senators 
Due to redistricting, the 22nd district has been moved around different parts of the state. The current iteration resulted from the 2011 redistricting by the California Citizens Redistricting Commission.

Election results 1994 - present

2018

2014

2010

2006

2002

1998

1994

See also 
 California State Senate
 California State Senate districts
 Districts in California

References

External links 
 District map from the California Citizens Redistricting Commission

22
Government of Los Angeles County, California
San Gabriel Valley
Alhambra, California
Arcadia, California
Azusa, California
Baldwin Park, California
Covina, California
El Monte, California
City of Industry, California
La Puente, California
Monterey Park, California
Rosemead, California
San Gabriel, California
Temple City, California
West Covina, California